In probability theory, an -divergence is a function  that measures the difference between two probability distributions  and . Many common divergences, such as KL-divergence, Hellinger distance, and total variation distance, are special cases of -divergence.

History 
These divergences were introduced by Alfréd Rényi  in the same paper where he introduced the well-known Rényi entropy.

Definition

Non-singular case 

When there is no such reference distribution ready at hand, we can simply define , and proceed as above. This is a useful technique in more abstract proofs.

Extension to singular measures 
The above definition can be extended to cases where  is no longer satisfied. (Definition 7.1 of )

Properties

Basic properties 
 Linearity:  given a finite sequence of nonnegative real numbers  and generators .

In particular, the monotonicity implies that if a Markov process has a positive equilibrium probability distribution  then  is a monotonic (non-increasing) function of time, where the probability distribution  is a solution of the Kolmogorov forward equations (or Master equation), used to describe the time evolution of the probability distribution in the Markov process. This means that all f-divergences  are the Lyapunov functions of the Kolmogorov forward equations. Reverse statement is also true:  If  is a Lyapunov function   for all   Markov chains with positive equilibrium  and is of the trace-form
() then , for some convex function f. For example, Bregman divergences in general do not have such property and can increase in Markov processes.

Analytic properties 
The f-divergences can be expressed using Taylor series and rewritten using a weighted sum of chi-type distances.

Variational representations 

Let  be the effective domain of 
, that is, . Then we have two variational representations of :

This is Theorem 7.24 in.

Example applications 

The domain over which  varies is not affine-invariant in general, unlike the -divergence case.

For general , the domain over which  varies is merely scale-invariant.

This is strictly less efficient than the Donsker-Varadhan representationThis defect is fixed by the next theorem.

This is Theorem 7.25 in.

Example applications 
Applying this theorem to KL-divergence yields the Donsker-Varadhan representation.

Attempting to apply this theorem to general -divergence with  does not yield a closed-form solution.

Common examples of f-divergences 
The following table lists many of the common divergences between probability distributions and the possible generating functions to which they correspond. Notably, except for total variation distance, all others are special cases of -divergence, or linear sums of -divergences. 

That is, for any  that generates an f-divergence, we have . This freedom is not only convenient, but actually necessary.

In particular, this shows that the squared Hellinger distance and Jensen-Shannon divergence are symmetric.

In the literature, the -divergences are sometimes parametrized as

which is equivalent to the parametrization in this page by substituting .

Relations to other statistical divergences

Rényi divergence 
The Rényi divergences is a family of divergences defined by

when .

Simple algebra shows that , where  is the -divergence defined above.

KL divergence 

Bregman divergence 
The only f-divergence that is also a Bregman divergence is the KL divergence.

Financial interpretation 

A pair of probability distributions can be viewed as a game of chance in which one of the distributions defines the official odds and the other contains the actual probabilities. Knowledge of the actual probabilities allows a player to profit from the game. For a large class of rational players the expected profit rate has the same general form as the ƒ-divergence.

See also
 Kullback–Leibler divergence
 Bregman divergence

References